Bricookea is a genus of fungi in the family Phaeosphaeriaceae. It is named in honor of mycologist William Bridge Cooke.

References

Phaeosphaeriaceae
Dothideomycetes genera
Taxa described in 1982